King's Law Journal is published for The Dickson Poon School of Law at King's College London by Taylor & Francis. It was established in 1990 as King's College Law Journal and changed to the present title in 2007. It publishes peer-reviewed scholarly articles, notes, reports, and book reviews. The general editor is Keith Ewing.

External links

British law journals
General law journals
English-language journals
Publications established in 1990
Triannual journals
Taylor & Francis academic journals